Queen Heonui of the Chungju Yu clan was a Goryeo royal family member as the daughter of Wang Jeong and a granddaughter of King Taejo who became a queen consort through her marriage with her first cousin, King Gyeongjong as his second wife. From this marriage, Queen Heonui became the second reigned Goryeo queen who followed her maternal clan after Queen Daemok, her mother-in-law and formerly aunt.

In popular culture
Portrayed by Choi Young-wan in the 2009 KBS2 TV series Empress Cheonchu.

References

External links
Queen Heonui on Encykorea .
헌의왕후 on Doosan Encyclopedia .

Royal consorts of the Goryeo Dynasty
Year of birth unknown
Year of death unknown
Korean queens consort
10th-century Korean people